Trinidad is a city in Bolivia, 878 kilometres north of Sucre, the capital of Bolivia. The city is 23 kilometres away from Mentiroso Lake and Arroyo Verde Creek. Nearby settlements include: Buzeta, San Luis and Santo Domingo.

Climate and geography 
Because Trinidad is in the Amazon Rainforest of Bolivia, east of the Andes, there are no earthquakes in Trinidad.

References

Populated places in Pando Department